Sophie is a Canadian television sitcom that aired on CBC from January 9, 2008, to March 23, 2009.

It stars Natalie Brown as Sophie Parker, an unmarried single mother and talent agent. The show is an English-language adaptation of Télévision de Radio-Canada's show Les Hauts et les bas de Sophie Paquin.

The show was created by Richard Blaimert and its executive producer is Jocelyn Deschênes, the same creative team behind the original series. It was the CBC's second attempt in as many years to create an English adaptation of a successful series from its French sister network, following the less successful Rumours.

In February 2008, it was announced that the show had been bought by ABC Family, part of Disney–ABC Television Group in the United States. The network signed on for the first 13 episodes, as well as an option for the second season of the show.

On March 27, 2009, the series was cancelled by CBC due to poor ratings.

Characters
 Sophie Parker (Natalie Brown) is a businesswoman and single mother who runs her own talent agency. Just hours after being told by a psychic that she was about to have the worst year of her life, her boyfriend Rick ran off with her best friend Melissa while Sophie was still pregnant with what she and Rick thought was Rick's baby. Soon afterward, she gave birth and discovered that the baby (named Robert) couldn't be Rick's child after all: he's half black. It turns out Robbie was conceived in a one-night stand Sophie had with André (played by Lyriq Bent in flashbacks), whom she met in a cab in New York City. At first, she did not have any contact with him and went as far as shredding his business card. But in the first-season finale, he would later show up to see her, and upon learning that he was a father, he walked out on Sophie and left her devastated, only to return hours later to see Sophie with her ex-boyfriend Rick at her apartment.
 Rick Ryder (Sebastian Spence) is Sophie's ex-boyfriend and former business partner who now runs his own competing talent agency which stole most of Sophie's clients. Despite the end of their relationship, however, they can't seem to get away from each other, in part because Sophie's mother is constantly plotting to reunite them. His continued presence in Sophie's life also complicates her efforts to find a new boyfriend: in one episode, he accidentally sees Melissa giving Sophie's current love interest a few pointers on how Sophie likes to be flirted with, mistakes him for someone Melissa is seeing behind his back, and later punches him in the face at a gallery show. In the first-season finale, he almost asked Melissa to marry him, but when that failed he saw Sophie crying over being rejected by André and as they were about to go get a drink, he sees André walking towards the two.
 Melissa Bryant (Amy Lalonde) is Sophie's former best friend and Rick's current girlfriend. A bit ditzy, she still thinks of Sophie as a dear friend — even helping her to line up dates and begging her to dogsit — and is unaware of how much she hurt Sophie by stealing Rick. She dotes on her dog like a baby, sometimes giving it more attention and TLC than she gives Rick. In the first-season finale, Rick tried to ask Melissa to marry him, only to have the two argue, resulting in Rick leaving and Melissa furious.
 Matt Scott (Jeff Geddis) is Sophie's gay best friend and confidant. Although in a relationship with Verner, a Swiss immigrant, he is not entirely committed to it and also has an eye for Bernard, a waiter at the café where he and Sophie hang out, and eventually slept with. In the end, he did confess to Verner and eventually made up by going off to Switzerland together.
 Judith Parker (Mimi Kuzyk) is Sophie's manipulative control freak mother. She is determined to reunite Sophie and Rick, faking a suicide attempt so that she can insist that they take care of her together and deliberately interfering when Sophie dates anyone who isn't Rick.
 Estelle Burroughs (Sara Botsford) is a pretentious and flighty actress who affects a Received Pronunciation English accent, and the only client of Sophie's agency who didn't defect to Rick's new firm (although Sophie wouldn't be upset if she did). She was also the mistress of Sophie's late father for many years (as Sophie tells Judith about why she was signed to the agency, "She came with the deal. He put it in the will."), complicating her professional relationship with Sophie, but at times comes through for her. In one episode, Estelle played a part in getting Sophie a sought-after client after she recognized Estelle from in a play called Learning Rainbows and was a fan of Estelle. She thinks of herself as a positive force in Sophie's life, which makes one of them.
 Ophelia Burroughs (Chantelle Chung) is Estelle's teenage daughter, whom Estelle adopted from China. Ophelia has no love for Estelle whatsoever.
 Bridget (Catherine Bérubé) is Sophie's scheming receptionist, constantly trying to angle her way into a more senior job with the agency.
 Christian Parker (Tyler Hynes) is Sophie's younger brother. Recently paroled from prison, he is determined to exploit his family connections to launch his own reality show depicting his experience as an ex-con readjusting to life "on the outside".

Production
On February 5, 2008, it was announced that American broadcast rights to Sophie were purchased by ABC Family, which aired the series in 2009. ABC Family marketed the series as "original programming", although earlier seasons had already aired in Canada. The show was pulled from the lineup early in its run due to poor ratings.

On March 7, 2008, it was announced that CBC ordered a second season of the show. The second season started broadcasting on October 1, 2008, and ended on March 23, 2009.

DVD Releases
As of May 2009, no plans for any DVD releases of Sophie have been announced.

References

External links

 CBC Television: Sophie
 

2008 Canadian television series debuts
2009 Canadian television series endings
2000s Canadian sitcoms
2000s Canadian workplace comedy television series
CBC Television original programming
ABC Family original programming
Pregnancy-themed television shows
Television series about show business
2000s Canadian LGBT-related comedy television series
Canadian LGBT-related sitcoms